Double Trouble is the fifth album by Frankie Miller. The album took shape in April 1978 at the Record Plant in New York, with Miller receiving backing from drummer BJ Wilson from Procol Harum, guitarist Ray Russell, two-man horn section Chris Mercer and Martin Drover, and keyboardist and vocalist Paul Carrack, who co-wrote five of the songs with Miller. Steven Tyler from Aerosmith also makes a guest appearance as backing vocalist

Track listing

"Have You Seen Me Lately Joan"  (Frankie Miller)
"Double Heart Trouble"  (Andy Fraser)
"The Train" (Frankie Miller, Paul Carrack)
"You'll Be In My Mind" (Frankie Miller, Paul Carrack, Ray Russell, Jack Douglas)
"Good Time Love" (Frankie Miller, Paul Carrack)
"Love Waves" (Frankie Miller, Paul Carrack)
"(I Can't) Breakaway" (Frankie Miller, Paul Carrack)
"Stubborn Kind of Fellow"  (Marvin Gaye, William "Mickey" Stevenson, George Gordy)
"Love Is All Around"  (Andy Fraser)
"Goodnight Sweetheart" (Ray Noble, Jimmy Campbell, Reg Connelly)

Personnel
Frankie Miller - vocals, guitar
Ray Russell - guitar
Ian Gomm - guitar
Chrissy Stewart - bass guitar
Paul Carrack - keyboards, backing vocals
BJ Wilson - drums
Martin Drover - trumpet, flugelhorn
Chris Mercer - baritone & tenor saxophones
Richard Supa - backing vocals
Eric Troyer - backing vocals
Steven Tyler - backing vocals, harmonica on 4, 6, 9, 10
Karen Lawrence - backing vocals
Lonnie Groves - backing vocals

Production credits
Produced by Jack Douglas
Engineered by Sam Ginsberg, Lee DeCarlo, Nigel Walker

References

 

1978 albums
Frankie Miller albums
Albums produced by Jack Douglas (record producer)
Chrysalis Records albums